Abu Dhabi Sports or AD Sports is an Arabic television channel. It broadcasts from Abu Dhabi, capital of the United Arab Emirates and is owned by Abu Dhabi Media. Abu Dhabi Sports Channel is an UAE Arab satellite channel broadcast from Abu Dhabi.

Channels
 Abu Dhabi Sports 1 HD (FTA)
 Abu Dhabi Sports 2 HD (FTA)
 Abu Dhabi Sports Premium 1 HD (STARZPLAY)
 Abu Dhabi Sports Premium 2 HD (STARZPLAY)
 YAS Sports HD (FTA)
 Abu Dhabi Sports Asia 1 HD (STARZPLAY, elife from Eitsalat and du)
 Abu Dhabi Sports Asia 2 HD (STARZPLAY, elife from Eitsalat and du)
 AD FIGHT (elife from Eitsalat and du)
 Abu Dhabi Sports Extra HD (STARZPLAY, elife from Eitsalat)

Content

Football

Serie A (2022-2025) on STARZPLAY
Coppa Italia on STARZPLAY (60 matches on FTA Channels)
UAE Pro-League
A-League
Major League Soccer (2015-2022, exclude 2019 due to technical problems)
Arabian Gulf Cup
Arab Cup U-20
UAE League Cup
Arab Club Champions Cup
AFC Champions League (only UAE)
AFC Cup (only UAE)
AFC Women's Asian Cup India 2022 (only UAE)
2022 FIFA World Cup qualification (AFC) (only UAE)
AFC Asian Cup China 2023 (only UAE)
FIFA Club World Cup UAE 2021 (only UAE, Egypt and Kuwait)

Basketball 
United Arab Emirates national basketball team
NCAA Men's College Basketball 2013-2014

Tennis 
Mubadala World Tennis Championship Exhibition tournament
Moselle Open
Luxembourg Open

Motorsport 
24 Hours of Le Mans
24 Hours of Nürburgring
Macau GP
Superleague Formula
NASCAR
FIA Abu Dhabi Desert Challenge

Combat Sports 
Jiu jitsu (UAE)
UFC
UAE Warriors

TV blocks 
Manchester City TV
Roma TV 
Juventus TV
Lazio TV 
Bayern TV

Frequencies
Abu Dhabi Sports has many frequencies on different satellites.  Its pay channels are available in MENA on Nilesat (7.0W). One of its Free-to-air channels is available on Hotbird (13.0E):
 Eutelsat 7 West A (7.3W):
 Channels: Abu Dhabi Sports 1 HD, 2 HD, Yas Sports HD (FTA, all HD)
 Frequency: 11411.
 Polarization: Horizontal.
 Symbol Rate: 30000.
 FEC: 3/4
 BADR 6 (26.0E)
 Channels: Abu Dhabi Sports 1 & 2, Abu Dhabi Sports Extra (FTA)
 Frequency: 11804.
 Polarization: Horizontal.
 Symbol Rate: 27500.
 FEC: 3/4
 Hotbird (13.0E)
 Channels: Abu Dhabi Sports 1 (FTA, all HD)
 Frequency: 11747.
 Polarization: Vertical.
 Symbol Rate: 27500.
 FEC: 3/4
 Yahsat 1A (52.5E)
 Channels: Abu Dhabi Sports 1 HD, 2 HD (FTA)
 Frequency: 11861.
 Polarization: Horizontal.
 Symbol Rate: 27500.
 FEC: 8/9

Revamp
In October 2008, Abu Dhabi Al Riyadiya went online with a new identity, logo, and programs. On 8 August 2015, Abu Dhabi Sports changed the logo with a new look.

On 19 February 2020, Abu Dhabi Sports got a new logo after five years.

References

External links
adsports.ae
http://www.adtvnetwork.com
ADMC Sports Channel at LyngSat Packages page for Nilesat 7.0W
ADMC Sports Channel at LyngSat Packages page for BADR6 26.0E
ADMC Sports Channel at LyngSat Satellite page for Hotbird 13.0E

Sports television networks
Television stations in the United Arab Emirates
Television channels and stations established in 1969
Direct broadcast satellite services
Mass media in Abu Dhabi
Sports television in the United Arab Emirates
1969 establishments in the Trucial States